Star Awards 2009 (Chinese: 红星大奖 2009) was a television award ceremony held in Singapore. It was part of the annual Star Awards organised by MediaCorp for its Chinese language division (Channel 8 and Channel U). The awards took place at 26 April 2009 starting at 7pm at MediaCorp Studios, followed by a post-show party airing on Channel U after the ceremony ended.

The nominations were announced on 24 February 2009, and the popularity awards later on 27 March. As like previous years, most technical category awards were presented outside the ceremony. The Best Info-Ed Programme Host award was introduced to recognise infotainment show hosts.

The nomination lists for the main categories were announced on 24 February 2009. Nominations for the popularity awards (Top 10 Most Popular Male and Female Artistes) were announced on 27 March 2009.

In contrast of previous Star Awards ceremonies which were held at the end of the year (month of December), a change in the eligibility period for television season (from September of each year to a full calendar year) resulted in 2008 having no ceremonies, and this was the first award ceremony in Star Awards history to be held on the month of April and the format had remained for the future ceremonies since; however, the format was disrupted in the 2020 ceremony as a result of the ongoing COVID-19 pandemic which caused the ceremony to be postponed from the usual April.

Due to a format change on having two shows in the following year, this was the last Star Awards ceremony, to present the Technical Awards outside the main show until Star Awards 2016, as well as hosting a single award ceremony (not counting prelude or special episodes) until Star Awards 2017.

The Little Nyonya became the biggest winner for the 2009 ceremony, having records of breaking the number of nominations and wins with 16 and 9, respectively, surpassing the former record holder in the 2003 ceremony's drama, Holland V, which got 10 and 7, respectively. The record for the nominations would remain held until the 2014 ceremony, where it was first beaten by The Dream Makers (season 1), which had 21 nominations and a record-tying nine wins; the number of wins would also be beaten in the 2016 ceremony, in which The Dream Makers (season 2) surpassed the record of both nominations and wins with 26 and 12, respectively.

Winners and nominees
Unless otherwise stated, winners are listed first, highlighted in boldface.

Backstage Achievement Awards Ceremony
As like preceding ceremonies, Professional and Technical Awards were presented before the main ceremony via a clip montage due to time constraints. The lists of winners are only reflected in the table.

Main Ceremony

{| class=wikitable
|-
| valign="top" width="50%"|
 
The Little Nyonya 小娘惹By My Side 不凡的爱
Just in Singapore 一房半厅一水缸
Love Blossoms 心花朵朵开I
Perfect Cut 一切完美
The Golden Path 黄金路
| valign="top" width="50%"|
 Life Transformers 心晴大动员Buzzing Cashier 抢摊大行动
CelebriTEA Break 艺点心思
King of Thrift 2 Smart省钱王 2Star Chef 2 至尊厨王2Superband 非常Superband
|-
| valign="top" width="50%"|
 MediaCorp 45th Anniversary Gala 45载光芒8方贺台庆The Sichuan Earthquake Charity Show 让爱川流不息S-Pop Hurray! Music Gala S-POP万岁！音乐大典Star Awards 25th Anniversary Show 红星大奖之戏剧情牵25Star Search 2007- Grand Finals 才华横溢出新秀2007总决赛Superband- Grand Finals 非常Superband – 大决战
| valign="top" width="50%"|'Tuesday Report: In The Face Of Death 星期二特写：生死一线Come Dance with Me 与心共舞
Food Hometown 美食寻根
My World My Blog 青涩部落格
Of Rites And Rituals 2 我们的大日子2
Tuesday Report: 5 Years SARS-free 星期二特写:SARS后的天空
|-
| valign="top" width="50%"|
 Chen Han Wei 陈汉玮  – By My Side 不凡的爱Huang Wenyong 黄文永  – Just in Singapore 一房半厅一水缸
Adrian Pang 彭耀顺  – Nanny Daddy 奶爸百分百
Pierre Png 方展发  – The Little Nyonya 小娘惹
Qi Yuwu 戚玉武  –  The Little Nyonya 小娘惹
Tay Ping Hui 郑斌辉  –  The Golden Path 黄金路
| valign="top" width="50%"|
 Joanne Peh 白微秀  – The Little Nyonya 小娘惹Jeanette Aw 欧萱  – The Little Nyonya 小娘惹
Chen Liping 陈莉萍  – Just in Singapore 一房半厅一水缸
Chen Liping 陈莉萍  – The Golden Path 黄金路
Felicia Chin 陈靓瑄  – The Golden Path 黄金路
Fann Wong 范文芳  – The Defining Moment 沸腾冰点
|-
| valign="top" width="50%"|
 Chew Chor Meng 周初明  – The Golden Path 黄金路Dai Yang Tian 戴阳天  – The Little Nyonya 小娘惹
Darren Lim 林明伦  – The Little Nyonya 小娘惹
San Yow 姚文龙  – The Little Nyonya 小娘惹
Zzen Zhang 张镇祥  – The Little Nyonya 小娘惹
Zhu Houren 朱厚任  – The Defining Moment 沸腾冰点
| valign="top" width="50%"|
 Ng Hui 黄慧  – The Little Nyonya 小娘惹Xiang Yun 向云  – The Little Nyonya 小娘惹Cai Peixuan 蔡佩璇  – The Golden Path 黄金路
Eelyn Kok 郭惠雯  – The Little Nyonya 小娘惹
Li Yinzhu 李茵珠  – The Little Nyonya 小娘惹
Lin Meijiao 林梅娇  – The Little Nyonya 小娘惹
|-
| valign="top" width="50%"|
 Guo Liang 郭亮  – CelebriTEA Break 艺点心思Marcus Chin 陈建彬  – Golden Age Singing Contest 2008 黄金年华之斗歌竞艺2008
Christopher Lee 李铭顺  – Life Transformers 心晴大动员
Lee Teng 李腾  – On the Beat 3 都市大发现3
Kym Ng 鐘琴  – Buzzing Cashier 抢摊大行动
Quan Yi Fong 权怡凤  – Life Transformers 心晴大动员
| valign="top" width="50%"|
 Belinda Lee 李心钰  – Come Dance With Me 与心共舞Chua Lee Lian 蔡礼莲  – Food Old Days 寻找原之味
Guo Liang 郭亮  – Breaking Barriers 亮点人生 - 真情无障碍
Belinda Lee 李心钰  – Find Me A Singaporean 2 稀游记2
Christina Lim 林佩芬  – So Simple 简单就是美
Dasmond Koh 许振荣  – Tourism Insiders 旅游线上我在行
|-
| valign="top" width="50%"|
 Dai Yang Tian 戴阳天Andie Chen 陈邦鋆
Paige Chua 蔡琦慧
Koh Yah Hwee 许雅慧
Jerry Yeo 杨伟烈
Zhang Zhen Huan 张振寰
| valign="top" width="50%"|
 Tung Soo Hua 董素华Lin Chi Yuan 林启元
Ng Siew Leng 黄秀玲
Wang Zheng 王征
Zhang Haijie 张海洁
Zhao Wenbei 赵文倍
|-
| valign="top" width="50%"|
 Regene Lim 林咏谊  – Perfect Cut 一切完美Clarence Hu 胡康乐  – La Femme 绝对佳人
Lin Jia An 林家安  – By My Side 不凡的爱
Ng Xin Yi 黄馨仪  – Love Blossoms I 心花朵朵开I
Peng Xiu Xuan 彭修轩  – Just in Singapore 一房半厅一水缸
Christabelle Tan 陈宇萱  – The Little Nyonya 小娘惹
| valign="top" width="50%"|
 Olivia Ong  – The Little Nyonya 小娘惹  – 《如燕》'Chew Sin Huey 石欣卉  – Perfect Cut 一切完美 – 《我知道我变漂亮了》
Mi Lu Bin 迷路兵  – The Golden Path 黄金路  – 《路》
Cavin Soh 苏智诚  – Love Blossoms I 心花朵朵开I  – 《心花朵朵开》
Daren Tan Sze Wei 陈世维  – Crime Busters x 2 叮当神探  – 《幻听》
Yi Xun 亦迅  – Just in Singapore一房半厅一水缸 – 《屋檐》
|}

All Time Favourite Artiste
This award is a special achievement award given out to artiste(s) who have achieved a maximum of 10 popularity awards over 10 years.

Top 10 awards

Top 10 Highest Viewership Local Dramas 2008

Presenters
The following individuals presented awards or performed musical numbers.

Star Awards 2010 nominations
The ceremony was nominated for "Best Set Design" and "Best Variety Special" on the ceremony next year, but lost to 3-Plus-1 (三菜一汤2) and The Chinese Challenge Grand Finals'' (华文？谁怕谁！总决赛), respectively.

External links
Official website
Nominations announced! MediaCorp VP Branding & Promotions Paul Chan
Nomination list for Star Awards 2009 (in Chinese)

References

2009 television awards
Star Awards